The Salarzai are one of the four Tarkani clans. They inhabit what is now Bajaur District in Khyber Pakhtunkhwa, Pakistan. In 2014, they may have been the majority tribe among the area's 600,000 population. In common with some other tribes of the area, it has been reported that they have formed militias to oppose the Taliban.

The Salarzai have a close connection to some inhabitants of the neighbouring Kunar Province.

References

Sarbani Pashtun tribes
People from Khyber Pakhtunkhwa
People from Bajaur District